Qui (also Romanized as Qū’ī; also known as Ghoo’i and Qūyu) is a village in Shivanat Rural District of Afshar District of Khodabandeh County, Zanjan province, Iran. At the 2006 National Census, its population was 949 in 177 households. The following census in 2011 counted 919 people in 233 households. The latest census in 2016 showed a population of 793 people in 190 households; it was the largest village in its rural district.

References 

Khodabandeh County

Populated places in Zanjan Province

Populated places in Khodabandeh County